Tarryn Fisher (born 1983) is a South African-born novelist based in Seattle, Washington, United States. She writes primarily in the romance, thriller, and new adult genres, and is best known for her New York Times best selling novels The Wives and The Wrong Family.

Early life and career 
Tarryn Fisher was born in Johannesburg, South Africa, to a White South African family. Her father, Dennis Fisher, was a horse trainer and his wife, Cynthia Fisher, was a schoolteacher. The family left South Africa and moved to Broward County, Florida in 1985 when Fisher was 3 years old. She currently resides in Seattle, Washington, with her husband and children.
  
Fisher self-published her first novel, The Opportunist, through Amazon. Fisher's two most recent novels The Wives and The Wrong Family, were published by Harlequin Enterprises, a division of HarperCollins. Both titles made appearances on the New York Times Best Seller list. In a 2019 review of The Wives, Kirkus Reviews described the novel as "all a bit over the top, but Fisher is a slick writer who keeps a tight rein on her lightning-fast plot."

Bibliography 

Fisher, Tarryn (26 April 2022). An Honest Lie. ISBN 9781525811579

References

External links
 

Living people
1980s births
South African women novelists
People from Johannesburg
South African emigrants to the United States
21st-century South African novelists
21st-century South African women writers